William F. Gackle (born December 7, 1927), was an American politician who was a member of the North Dakota House of Representatives. As a Republican, he represented the 28th district from 1963 to 1964 and from 1967 to 1980. He attended Howard College in San Angelo, Texas and was later a farmer.

References

1927 births
Living people
North Dakota Republicans
People from LaMoure County, North Dakota